This is a list of nature centers and environmental education centers in the state of Kansas. 

To use the sortable tables: click on the icons at the top of each column to sort that column in alphabetical order; click again for reverse alphabetical order.

Resources
 Kansas Association for Conservation and Environmental Education
 Natural Kansas - Kansas Department of Wildlife, Parks & Tourism

External links
 Map of nature centers and environmental education centers in Kansas

 
Nature centers
Kansas